= International cricket in 1896–97 =

International cricket season

The 1896–97 international cricket season was from September 1896 to April 1897. The season included only first-class tours among Australia, England and the West Indies.

== Season overview ==
International tours
Start date	Home team	Away team	Results [Matches]			
Start date	Home team	Away team	Test	ODI	FC	LA
26 November 1896	New Zealand	Australia	—	—	0–1 [1]	—
26 December 1896	New Zealand	Queensland	—	—	1–0 [1]	—
1 February 1897	Trinidad and Tobago	England	—	—	1–0 [1]	—
15 February 1897	West Indies	England	—	—	1–0 [1]	—
